The women's team regu sepak takraw competition at the 2018 Asian Games was held at Ranau Sports Hall, Palembang, Indonesia from 19 to 22 August 2018.

Squads

Results
All times are Western Indonesia Time (UTC+07:00)

Preliminary

Group A

|-
|rowspan=2|19 August||rowspan=2|12:00
|rowspan=2 align=right|
|rowspan=2 align=center|3–0
|rowspan=2 align=left|
|colspan=3|2–0||colspan=3|2–0||colspan=3|2–0
|-
|21–10||21–9|| ||21–6||21–13|| ||21–14||21–4||
|-

|-
|rowspan=2|19 August||rowspan=2|12:00
|rowspan=2 align=right|
|rowspan=2 align=center|0–3
|rowspan=2 align=left|
|colspan=3|0–2||colspan=3|0–2||colspan=3|0–2
|-
|11–21||5–21|| ||8–21||8–21|| ||14–21||6–21||
|-

|-
|rowspan=2|20 August||rowspan=2|12:00
|rowspan=2 align=right|
|rowspan=2 align=center|1–2
|rowspan=2 align=left|
|colspan=3|0–2||colspan=3|0–2||colspan=3|2–1
|-
|13–21||14–21|| ||17–21||16–21|| ||21–16||16–21||25–24
|-

|-
|rowspan=2|20 August||rowspan=2|12:00
|rowspan=2 align=right|
|rowspan=2 align=center|3–0
|rowspan=2 align=left|
|colspan=3|2–0||colspan=3|2–0||colspan=3|2–0
|-
|21–9||21–13|| ||21–17||23–21|| ||21–11||21–15||
|-

|-
|rowspan=2|21 August||rowspan=2|12:00
|rowspan=2 align=right|
|rowspan=2 align=center|3–0
|rowspan=2 align=left|
|colspan=3|2–0||colspan=3|2–0||colspan=3|2–0
|-
|21–7||21–6|| ||21–8||21–5|| ||21–10||21–5||
|-

|-
|rowspan=2|21 August||rowspan=2|12:00
|rowspan=2 align=right|
|rowspan=2 align=center|0–3
|rowspan=2 align=left|
|colspan=3|0–2||colspan=3|0–2||colspan=3|0–2
|-
|9–21||14–21|| ||10–21||14–21|| ||11–21||13–21||
|-

Group B

|-
|rowspan=2|19 August||rowspan=2|09:00
|rowspan=2 align=right|
|rowspan=2 align=center|1–2
|rowspan=2 align=left|
|colspan=3|2–0||colspan=3|1–2||colspan=3|0–2
|-
|21–12||21–12|| ||16–21||21–15||18–21||16–21||20–22||
|-

|-
|rowspan=2|19 August||rowspan=2|09:00
|rowspan=2 align=right|
|rowspan=2 align=center|0–3
|rowspan=2 align=left|
|colspan=3|0–2||colspan=3|1–2||colspan=3|0–2
|-
|11–21||13–21|| ||21–18||13–21||13–21||10–21||10–21||
|-

|-
|rowspan=2|19 August||rowspan=2|15:00
|rowspan=2 align=right|
|rowspan=2 align=center|3–0
|rowspan=2 align=left|
|colspan=3|2–0||colspan=3|2–0||colspan=3|2–0
|-
|21–12||21–11|| ||21–9||21–4|| ||21–12||21–17||
|-

|-
|rowspan=2|19 August||rowspan=2|15:00
|rowspan=2 align=right|
|rowspan=2 align=center|2–1
|rowspan=2 align=left|
|colspan=3|0–2||colspan=3|2–0||colspan=3|2–0
|-
|15–21||8–21|| ||21–12||21–17|| ||21–19||21–8||
|-

|-
|rowspan=2|20 August||rowspan=2|09:00
|rowspan=2 align=right|
|rowspan=2 align=center|0–3
|rowspan=2 align=left|
|colspan=3|0–2||colspan=3|0–2||colspan=3|0–2
|-
|9–21||15–21|| ||17–21||17–21|| ||18–21||13–21||
|-

|-
|rowspan=2|20 August||rowspan=2|09:00
|rowspan=2 align=right|
|rowspan=2 align=center|1–2
|rowspan=2 align=left|
|colspan=3|0–2||colspan=3|2–1||colspan=3|0–2
|-
|16–21||9–21|| ||13–21||22–20||23–21||13–21||10–21||
|-

|-
|rowspan=2|20 August||rowspan=2|15:00
|rowspan=2 align=right|
|rowspan=2 align=center|1–2
|rowspan=2 align=left|
|colspan=3|2–0||colspan=3|1–2||colspan=3|0–2
|-
|21–7||21–10|| ||12–21||21–16||19–21||14–21||19–21||
|-

|-
|rowspan=2|20 August||rowspan=2|15:00
|rowspan=2 align=right|
|rowspan=2 align=center|3–0
|rowspan=2 align=left|
|colspan=3|2–1||colspan=3|2–0||colspan=3|2–0
|-
|17–21||21–13||21–19||21–19||21–12|| ||23–21||22–20||
|-

|-
|rowspan=2|21 August||rowspan=2|09:00
|rowspan=2 align=right|
|rowspan=2 align=center|3–0
|rowspan=2 align=left|
|colspan=3|2–1||colspan=3|2–0||colspan=3|2–0
|-
|19–21||21–16||21–8||21–5||21–8|| ||21–13||21–17||
|-

|-
|rowspan=2|21 August||rowspan=2|09:00
|rowspan=2 align=right|
|rowspan=2 align=center|0–3
|rowspan=2 align=left|
|colspan=3|0–2||colspan=3|0–2||colspan=3|1–2
|-
|11–21||13–21|| ||12–21||17–21|| ||21–18||12–21||19–21
|-

Knockout round

Semifinals

|-
|rowspan=2|22 August||rowspan=2|10:00
|rowspan=2 align=right|
|rowspan=2 align=center|2–0
|rowspan=2 align=left|
|colspan=3|2–0||colspan=3|2–0||colspan=3|
|-
|21–13||21–14|| ||21–10||21–6|| || || ||
|-
|rowspan=2|22 August||rowspan=2|10:00
|rowspan=2 align=right|
|rowspan=2 align=center|0–2
|rowspan=2 align=left|
|colspan=3|1–2||colspan=3|1–2||colspan=3|
|-
|16–21||21–19||13–21||21–17||5–21||9–21|| || ||
|-

Gold medal match

|-
|rowspan=2|22 August||rowspan=2|16:00
|rowspan=2 align=right|
|rowspan=2 align=center|2–0
|rowspan=2 align=left|
|colspan=3|2–0||colspan=3|2–0||colspan=3|
|-
|21–16||21–7|| ||21–14||21–15|| || || ||
|-

References

External links
Sepak takraw at the 2018 Asian Games

Sepak takraw at the 2018 Asian Games